Antonio Pio (Cesena, 1809 – London, 1871) was an Italian painter, depicting history, literary themes, and genre pieces.

Biography
He studied in Rome at the Accademia di San Luca under Tommaso Minardi, worked in Cesena during the 1840s, after which he moved around for many years, between the cities of Florence, Paris and London, where he died in 1871. Pio was also a  portrait painter, and painted a “Pastorello” now in the Pinacoteca Comunale di Cesena. He painted an Apotheosis of Dante for the Sipario of the Municipal theater of Cesena.

References

1809 births
1871 deaths
People from Cesena
19th-century Italian painters
Italian male painters
19th-century Italian male artists